Drilling is the cutting of a hole into a solid.

Drilling may also refer to:
 Boring (earth), cutting a hole into the earth
 Combination gun, a multi-barreled firearm

See also
 Data drilling
 Drill (disambiguation)
 Perforation (disambiguation)
 Boring (disambiguation)